Cryptonychini is a tribe of beetles in the subfamily Cassidinae (tortoise and leaf-mining beetles).

Genera 
 Aulostyrax
 Brontispa
 Calamispa
 Caledonispa
 Callistola
 Ceratispa
 Cryptonychus
 Drescheria
 Gestronella
 Gyllenhaleus
 Ischnispa
 Isopedhispa
 Nesohispa
 Octodonta
 Oxycephala
 Palmispa
 Plesispa
 Stephanispa
 Teretrispa
 Torquispa
 Xiphispa

References

External links 
 

 

Cassidinae
Polyphaga tribes